Mikhail Lyzhin (born 9 August 1973) is a Russian freestyle skier. He competed in the men's moguls event at the 1992 Winter Olympics.

References

External links
 

1973 births
Living people
Russian male freestyle skiers
Olympic freestyle skiers of the Unified Team
Freestyle skiers at the 1992 Winter Olympics
Place of birth missing (living people)